CETO is a wave-energy technology that converts kinetic energy from ocean swell into electrical power and (in CETO 5) directly desalinates freshwater through reverse osmosis. The technology was developed and tested onshore and offshore in Fremantle, Western Australia. In early 2015 a CETO 5 production installation was commissioned and connected to the grid.  all the electricity generated is being purchased to contribute towards the power requirements of HMAS Stirling naval base at Garden Island, Western Australia. Some of the energy will also be used directly to desalinate water.

CETO is designed to be a simple and robust wave technology.  CETO is claimed to be the only ocean-tested wave-energy technology globally that is both fully submerged and generates power and or desalinated water onshore. The CETO technology has been independently verified by Energies Nouvelles (EDF EN) and the French naval contractor DCNS.

Technology

CETO 5
The name is inspired by the Greek ocean goddess, Ceto. , the system distinguishes itself from other wave-energy devices in being fully submerged. Submerged buoys are moved by the ocean swell and driving pumps that pressurize seawater delivered ashore by a subsea pipeline. Once onshore, the high-pressure seawater is used to drive hydro-electric turbines, generating electricity. The high-pressure seawater can also be used to supply a reverse osmosis desalination plant, producing freshwater. Some historic conventional seawater desalination plants are large emitters of greenhouse gases; this is due to the amount of energy required to drive the grid-connected pumps that deliver the high-pressure seawater to reverse osmosis membranes for the removal of the salt.

CETO 6
, CETO 6 is in development, and differs from CETO 5 in having a larger buoy, with the electrical generation onboard and the power being transferred to shore by an electrical cable. The buoy is designed for deeper water and further offshore than CETO 5.

Commercial demonstration and independent verification of results 
On completion of Stage 1 of the Perth Wave Energy Project, Carnegie enlisted Frazer-Nash Consultancy Ltd to verify the CETO 3 unit's measured and modelled capacity. During the CETO 3 in-ocean trial, Frazer–Nash verified the peak measured capacity to be 78 kW and delivered a sustained pressure of 77 bar, above what is required for seawater reverse-osmosis desalination.

Projects

Perth Wave Energy Project (PWEP) 
Stage 1, already been completed, involved the manufacture, deployment and testing of a single commercial-scale autonomous CETO unit off Garden Island. For this stage, the CETO unit was not connected to shore but was stand-alone and autonomous, providing telemetric data back to shore for confirmation and independent verification of the unit's performance.

Stage 2 involved the design, construction, deployment and operational performance evaluation of a grid-connected commercial-scale wave-energy demonstration project, also at Garden Island. The facility consisted of multiple submerged CETO units in an array, subsea pipeline(s) to shore, hydraulic conditioning equipment, and an onshore power generation facility.

In early 2015 a multi megawatt system was connected to the grid, with all the electricity being bought to power HMAS Stirling naval base. Two fully submerged buoys which are anchored to the seabed, transmit the energy from the ocean swell through hydraulic pressure onshore; to drive a generator for electricity, and also to produce fresh water.  a third buoy is planned for installation.

La Réunion Wave Energy Project 
The Réunion Island project is a joint venture between Carnegie and EDF Energies Nouvelles. The project will initially consist of the deployment of a single, autonomous commercial scale unit (stage 1) which will be followed by a 2MW plant (stage 2) and a further expansion of the project to a nominal 15MW installed capacity (stage 3).  stage 1 has been awarded $5M of French government funding.

A cable between a buoy and the seabed anchored hydraulic pump snapped in a CETO 4 prototype installation in January 2014. The buoy was swept away during Cyclone Bejisa, which also led to a fatality and widespread damage on Réunion Island. The design was an earlier iteration than the Perth CETO 5 installation and lacked the quick release mechanism which was included in CETO 5.

Ireland Wave Energy Project 
Carnegie has signed a formal funding and collaboration agreement with the Irish Government's Sustainable Energy Association (SEAI) for a €150,000 project to evaluate potential CETO wave sites in Ireland and develop a site-specific conceptual design. The project is 50% funded by the SEAI and 50% by Carnegie, and forms the first phase of detailed design for a potential 5 MW commercial demonstration project in Irish waters. The project was under way in 2011 and is being managed through Carnegie's Irish subsidiary, CETO Wave Energy Ireland Limited.

Relationships
Western Australian Government – $12.5M grant for the Perth Wave Energy Project at Garden Island.
Australian Department of Defence & Defence Support Group – MoU for Collaboration on a CETO power and water project and offtake.
EDF EN – Northern Hemisphere CETO Power licensee and JV development partner.
French Government – $5M grant for Carnegie/EDF EN Stage 1 Réunion Island power project.
DCNS – Northern HemisphereEPCM partner.
Sustainable Energy Authority of Ireland – Collaboration agreement & concept funding for a 5 MW Irish CETO power project.
British Columbia Government – Grant of $2M for a Canadian CETO project.
Australian National Centre of Excellence in Desalination – Desalination research project with funding granted.

Other wave energy and CETO characteristics
 Wave energy is a renewable, high availability source of power.
 About 60% of the human population lives within 60 kilometers of a coastline, minimising transmission issues.
 Since water is about 800 times denser than air, the energy density of waves exceeds that of wind and solar, increasing the amount of energy available for harvesting.
 Waves are predictable in advance, making it easier to predict mismatches between supply and demand.
 CETO does not stand for Cylindrical Energy Transfer Oscillating unit – a popular misconception. The name refers to Ceto, a Greek sea goddess.
 CETO sits underwater, moored to the sea floor, with minimal visual impact above the water. In practice, buoys have been fitted with warning lights on a mast above water.
 CETO units operate in deep water, away from breaking waves, meaning there is minimal impact on popular surfing sites.
 CETO units are designed to operate in harmony with the waves. This means, apart from anchor points, there is no need for massive steel and concrete support structures to be built.
 CETO units act like artificial reefs because of the way they attract marine life.

See also
 Wave energy
 Water desalination
 Wave farm
 Baseload
 Reverse osmosis
 World energy resources and consumption

References

External links
 Carnegie Wave Energy Limited
 World of Energy
 RISE
 Western Australian Sustainable Energy Association
 Carbon Trust

Wave power
Renewable energy technology